Beth Ann Bauman is an American writer of fiction based in New York City. Bauman has published a collection of short stories, Beautiful Girls in 2003 (MacAdam/Cage), and a novel for young adults, Rosie and Skate in 2009. Her work has been published in The Barcelona Review and the anthology Many Lights in Many Windows and has also been nominated for a Pushcart Prize. She has also received fellowships from the New York Foundation of the Arts and the Jerome Foundation.

Bibliography
Beautiful Girls (2003) (Short stories)
Rosie and Skate (2009) (Young adult novel)

References

External links
NY Times: A Writing Life (Article on Beth Ann Bauman)

American children's writers
Living people
Novelists from New York (state)
American women short story writers
American women novelists
Date of birth unknown
21st-century American novelists
American young adult novelists
American women children's writers
21st-century American women writers
Women writers of young adult literature
21st-century American short story writers
Year of birth missing (living people)